Zatyki  is a village in the administrative district of Gmina Gołdap, within Gołdap County, Warmian-Masurian Voivodeship, in northern Poland, close to the border with the Kaliningrad Oblast of Russia.

Zatyki is located between highways 65 and 650.  It is within two miles of the following townships: Wilkasy, Nasuty, and Rudzie.

References

Villages in Gołdap County